The 69th Massachusetts General Court, consisting of the Massachusetts Senate and the Massachusetts House of Representatives, met in 1848 during the governorship of George N. Briggs. Zeno Scudder served as president of the Senate and Francis Crowninshield served as speaker of the House.

Senators

Representatives

See also
 30th United States Congress
 List of Massachusetts General Courts

References

External links
 
 

Political history of Massachusetts
Massachusetts legislative sessions
massachusetts
1848 in Massachusetts